was an Edo period Japanese samurai, and the 5th daimyō  of Kaga Domain in the Hokuriku region of Japan. He was the 6th hereditary chieftain of the Kanazawa Maeda clan.

Yoshinori was the third son of Maeda Tsunanori. His mother was a commoner and a concubine. From 1702, he was named heir and was given the childhood name of Katsumaru (勝丸) later Matsudaira Inuchiyo-maru, later becoming Toshitaka (利挙) and then Toshioki (利興).  He underwent the genpuku ceremony with Shōgun Tokugawa Tsunayoshi presiding and was renamed Yoshiharu (吉治). In 1708, he was wed to Matsuhime, the adopted daughter of Tokugawa Tsunayoshi, the daughter of Tokugawa Tsunanari of Owari Domain. In 1723, his father retired, citing ill health, and he became daimyō of Kaga Domain as Maeda Yoshinori.

Although Kaga Domain was stable politically, and had been accorded the same status in audiences in Edo Castle as one of the  Gosanke, the economic position of the domain was growing precarious despite its one million koku status. Yoshinori's first task was to initiate a reform of domain finances. Spending had been profligate under the tenure of Tsunanori, partly to offset suspicions of the wealth of Kaga Domain by the Tokugawa shogunate. Yoshinori appointed one of his favourites, Ōtsuki Denzō, of ashigaru background, as his senior economic advisor and implemented an unpopular program of cutting expenses, curbing speculation in the rice market, and passing sumptuary consumption rules. Under this program, the domain's financial situation improved considerably, and Yoshinori appointed Ōtsuki to ever greater positions of authority. This caused great resentment amongst the senior retainers and on the death of Yoshinori in 1745 at the age of 56, there was a conservative backlash which upended many of the reforms.

Family 
Father: Maeda Tsunanori
 Mother: Omachi no Kata
 Wife: Tokugawa Matsuhime, daughter of Tokugawa Tsunanari of Owari Domain
 Concubines:
 Atae no Kata later Joshuin
 Shinkyo-in
 Otaki no Kata later Seigetsu’in
 Osada no Kata later Shin’nyoin
 Onui no Kata later Zenryo’in
 Oran no Kata
 Onatsu no Kata later Jusei’in
 Jitsujoin
 Okiyo no Kata Jisenin
Children:
Maeda Munetoki by Atae no Kata
Maeda Shigehiro by Shinkyo-in
 Wakko’in (1731-1731) by Shinkyo-in
 Maeda Toshikazu (1735-1759) by Osada no Kata
Maeda Shigenobu by Onui no Kata
Maeda Shigemichi by Jitsujoin
Maeda Harunaga by Onatsu no Kata 
Kiyohime (1732–1750), married Asano Munetsune of Hiroshima Domain by Otaki no Kata
Sōhime (1733–1758), married Maeda Toshiyuki of Toyama Domain by Osada no Kata
Gōhime (1737-1762), married Satake Yoshimasa of Kubota Domain by Osada no Kata
 Masahime (1739-1739) by Osada no Kata
 Maeda Yasogoro (1741-1761) by Osada no Kata
 Kiihime (1739-1740) by Oran no Kata
 Nobuhime (1740-1798) married Sakai Tadayoshi by Onatsu no Kata 
 Yasuhime (1743-1743) by Onatsu no Kata 
 Maeda Toshizane (1743-1766) by Okiyo no Kata
 daughter (1737)
 son (1743)
 Adopted Daughter: Ayuhime married Nanbu Toshikatsu, Maeda Toshiakira's daughter

Honors
1702: Senior 4th Grade, lower rank, Sakon-e-gon-shosho, Wakasa-no-kami
1723:  Kaga-no-kami, Sakonoe-shosho; Sakon-e-gon-chusho

References 
Papinot, Edmond. (1948). Historical and Geographical Dictionary of Japan. New York: Overbeck Co.
若林喜三郎 『前田綱紀』 吉川弘文館〈人物叢書〉、1986年、新装版。。
『江戸三百藩藩主列伝』 新人物往来社〈別冊歴史読本〉、2012年

External links
Kaga Domain on "Edo 300 HTML" (3 November 2007) 

1690 births
1745 deaths
Maeda clan
Tozama daimyo
People of Edo-period Japan